Waconia City Hall is located at 201 South Vine Street in Waconia, Minnesota, United States. The contemporary building was completed in 2004, and replaced the Old Waconia City Hall, a historic building constructed in 1909 that has been converted into senior housing.

Old Waconia City Hall

The Old Waconia City Hall at 9 West 1st Street is now Old City Hall Apartments, a senior housing facility. It was design by Charles Sumner Sedgwick and built in 1909. The building was nominated and listed on the National Register of Historic Places as "Waconia City Hall" in 1983. The renovation of Old City Hall for the construction of a 13 unit elderly Housing Project began in 1984.

It is a two-story red brick building,  in plan.

References

Buildings and structures in Carver County, Minnesota
Government buildings completed in 2004
Government buildings completed in 1909
City and town halls on the National Register of Historic Places in Minnesota
1909 establishments in Minnesota
Housing for the elderly in the United States